General Barrow may refer to:

Edmund Barrow (1852–1934), British Army general
George Barrow (Indian Army officer) (1864–1959), British Indian Army general
Harold Percy Waller Barrow (1876–1957), British Army major general
Robert H. Barrow (1922–2008), U.S. Marine Corps four-star general

See also
David Prescott Barrows (1873–1954), U.S. National Guard major general